These 236 species belong to the genus Naupactus, white-fringed weevils.

Naupactus species

 Naupactus acerbus Boheman, 1840 c g
 Naupactus aerosus Boheman, 1840 c g
 Naupactus agglomeratus Hustache, 1938 c g
 Naupactus albidiventris Hustache, 1947 c g
 Naupactus albidus Perroud, 1853 c g
 Naupactus albolateralis Hustache, 1947 c g
 Naupactus albopunctatus Boheman, 1840 c g
 Naupactus albovittatus Voss, 1932 c g
 Naupactus albulus Boheman, 1833 c g
 Naupactus alternevittatus Hustache, 1947 c g
 Naupactus ambiguus Boheman, 1840 c g
 Naupactus ambitiotus Boheman, 1833 c g
 Naupactus amens Boheman, 1833 c g
 Naupactus anceps Boheman, 1833 c g
 Naupactus ancora Marshall, 1949 c g
 Naupactus angulithorax Hustache, 1947 c g
 Naupactus annae Bordon, 1997 c g
 Naupactus anthribiformis Boheman, 1833 c g
 Naupactus aptus Boheman, 1840 c g
 Naupactus argentatus Hustache, 1947 c g
 Naupactus argenteus Hustache, 1947 c g
 Naupactus argentinensis Hustache, 1926 c g
 Naupactus argyrostomus Boheman, 1840 c g
 Naupactus aulacus Germar, 1824 c g
 Naupactus aurichalceus Boheman, 1833 c g
 Naupactus auricinctus Boheman, 1833 c g
 Naupactus auripes (Hustache, 1947) c g
 Naupactus aurolimbatus Boheman, 1840 c g
 Naupactus balteus Voss, 1934 c g
 Naupactus barbicauda Boheman, 1840 c g
 Naupactus basalis Hustache, 1947 c g
 Naupactus basilicus Germar, 1824 c g
 Naupactus bellus Boheman, 1833 c g
 Naupactus bipes (Germar, 1824) c g
 Naupactus bipunctatus Boheman, 1833 c g
 Naupactus bohumilae Bordon, 1997 c g
 Naupactus bondari Marshall, 1937 c g
 Naupactus bosqi Hustache, 1947 c g
 Naupactus brevicrinitus Hustache, 1947 c g
 Naupactus breviscapus Hustache, 1947 c g
 Naupactus bridgesii C. R. Waterhouse, 1844 c g
 Naupactus bruchi (Heller, 1921) c g
 Naupactus brunneus (Hustache, 1947) c g
 Naupactus calumuchitanensis Hustache, 1947 c g
 Naupactus camachoi Bordon, 1997 c g
 Naupactus carinirostris (Hustache, 1947) c g
 Naupactus caroli Hustache, 1947 c g
 Naupactus castaneus Hustache, 1947 c g
 Naupactus celator Boheman, 1833 g
 Naupactus celutor Boheman, 1833 c g
 Naupactus cephalotes (Hustache, 1947) c g
 Naupactus cervinus Boheman, 1840 c g b  (Fuller rose beetle)
 Naupactus chaconi Bordon, 1997 c g
 Naupactus chalybeipes Boheman, 1840 c g
 Naupactus chedasi Bordon, 1997 c g
 Naupactus chevrolati Boheman, 1833 c g
 Naupactus chloraspis Erichson, 1847 c g
 Naupactus chloris Hustache, 1947 c g
 Naupactus chloropleurus Pascoe, 1881 c g
 Naupactus chordinus Boheman, 1833 c g
 Naupactus cinerascens Perroud, 1853 c g
 Naupactus cinereidorsum Hustache, 1947 c g
 Naupactus cinerosus Boheman, 1833 c g
 Naupactus clavijoi Bordon, 1997 c g
 Naupactus concinnus Boheman, 1840 c g
 Naupactus condecoratus Boheman, 1840 c g
 Naupactus cupreus Bordon, 1997 c g
 Naupactus curialis Germar, 1824 c g
 Naupactus curtus Boheman, 1833 c g
 Naupactus curvilineus Boheman, 1840 c g
 Naupactus cypholdes Heller, 1921 c g
 Naupactus dapsilis Perty, 1832 c g
 Naupactus decorus (Fabricius, 1775) c g
 Naupactus delicatulus Hustache, 1947 c g
 Naupactus denudatus Hustache, 1923 c g
 Naupactus deplorabundus Boheman, 1833 c g
 Naupactus deses Schoenherr, 1840 c g
 Naupactus dissimilis Hustache, 1947 c g
 Naupactus dissimulator Boheman, 1840 c g
 Naupactus dives Klug, 1829 c g
 Naupactus faldermanni Boheman, 1840 c g
 Naupactus fatuus Boheman, 1833 c g
 Naupactus fernandezi Hustache, 1947 c g
 Naupactus fulgerens Lucas, 1857 c g
 Naupactus fulvus (Hustache, 1947) c g
 Naupactus fuscus Boheman, 1840 c g
 Naupactus glaucus Perty, 1832 c g
 Naupactus godmani (Crotch, 1867) g (syn. N. cervinus) (Fuller rose beetle)
 Naupactus habenatus Marshall, 1949 c g
 Naupactus hirsuticeps (Hustache, 1947) c g
 Naupactus hirsutus Hustache, 1947 c g
 Naupactus hirtellus (Voss, 1932) c g
 Naupactus humilis (Hustache, 1947) c g
 Naupactus hypocrita Germar, 1824 c g
 Naupactus illotus Germar, 1824 c g
 Naupactus imbellis Hustache, 1947 c g
 Naupactus imbutus Pascoe, 1881 c g
 Naupactus impurus Boheman, 1833 c g
 Naupactus inermis Hustache, 1947 c g
 Naupactus insignis Boheman, 1840 c g
 Naupactus instabilis Boheman, 1840 c g
 Naupactus institor Boheman, 1833 c g
 Naupactus interruptus Hustache, 1947 c g
 Naupactus jacobi Hustache, 1947 c g
 Naupactus jekelii Kirsch, 1874 c g
 Naupactus jimbriatus Hustache, 1938 c g
 Naupactus jolyi Bordon, 1997 c g
 Naupactus lar Germar, 1824 c g
 Naupactus laticeps Champion, 1911 c g
 Naupactus laticollis Hustache, 1947 c g
 Naupactus latifrons Boheman, 1833 c g
 Naupactus lattkei Bordon, 1997 c g
 Naupactus leucogaster Perty, 1832 c g
 Naupactus leucographus Boheman, 1840 c g
 Naupactus leucoloma Boh. in Schoenh., 1840 c g b
 Naupactus leucophaeus Boheman, 1833 c g
 Naupactus lineatus Boheman, 1840 c g
 Naupactus litoris Bordon, 1997 c g
 Naupactus lizeri Hustache, 1923 c g
 Naupactus llanensis Bordon, 1997 c g
 Naupactus longimanus (Fabricius, 1775) c g
 Naupactus loripes (Germar, 1824) c g
 Naupactus luteipes (Hustache, 1947) c g
 Naupactus mariaeloisiae Bordon, 1997 c g
 Naupactus maritimus Bordon, 1997 c g
 Naupactus martinezi Bordon, 1997 c g
 Naupactus mimicus Hustache, 1938 c g
 Naupactus minor Buchanan, 1942 c g
 Naupactus minutellus Wibmer & O'Brien, 1986 c g
 Naupactus minutus Hustache, 1938 c g
 Naupactus morio Boheman, 1833 c g
 Naupactus mulsanti Perroud, 1853 c g
 Naupactus navicularis Boheman, 1840 c g
 Naupactus navus Marshall, 1949 c g
 Naupactus nubilosus Boheman, 1840 c g
 Naupactus obsoletus Kirsch, 1874 c g
 Naupactus ocami Bordon, 1997 c g
 Naupactus ochreonotatus Voss, 1934 c g
 Naupactus optatus (Herbst, 1797) c g
 Naupactus opulentus Voss, 1940 c g
 Naupactus ornatus Pascoe, 1879 c g
 Naupactus ovatus (Hustache, 1947) c g
 Naupactus pallidulus  b
 Naupactus pallidus  b
 Naupactus parallelus Hustache, 1947 c g
 Naupactus pedestris Voss, 1934 c g
 Naupactus penai Bordon, 1997 c g
 Naupactus peregrinus (Buchanan, 1939) c g b
 Naupactus peruvianus Hustache, 1938 c g
 Naupactus pictus Boheman, 1840 c g
 Naupactus pilipes Hustache, 1947 c g
 Naupactus pithecius Germar, 1824 c g
 Naupactus plagiatus Lucas, 1857 c g
 Naupactus polliger Boheman, 1833 c g
 Naupactus postfasciatus (Hustache, 1947) c g
 Naupactus postsignatus Voss, 1940 c g
 Naupactus praedatus Erichson, 1847 c g
 Naupactus prasinus (Hustache, 1947) c g
 Naupactus prasnius Hustache, 1947 c g
 Naupactus proximus Voss, 1934 c g
 Naupactus pulchellus Kuschel, 1958 c g
 Naupactus pupulus Boheman, 1840 c g
 Naupactus purpureoviolaceus Hustache, 1947 c g
 Naupactus rivulosus (Olivier, 1790) i c g
 Naupactus rnacilentus Boheman, 1833 c g
 Naupactus roborosus Germar, 1824 c g
 Naupactus romeroi Bordon, 1997 c g
 Naupactus rosalesi Bordon, 1997 c g
 Naupactus roscidus Erichson, 1848 c g
 Naupactus rubiginosus (Fabricius, 1801) c g
 Naupactus ruficornis Boheman, 1840 c g
 Naupactus rugosus Hustache, 1947 c g
 Naupactus ruizi Brèthes, 1925 c g
 Naupactus sahlbergi Boheman, 1840 c g
 Naupactus sanamnsis Bordon, 1997 c g
 Naupactus sanfilippoi Bordon, 1997 c g
 Naupactus sanguinipes Hustache, 1938 c g
 Naupactus santanae Bordon, 1997 c g
 Naupactus scelestus Boheman, 1833 c g
 Naupactus schapleri Hustache, 1947 c g
 Naupactus schnusei Voss, 1954 c g
 Naupactus sellatus Boheman, 1840 c g
 Naupactus serenus Pascoe, 1881 c g
 Naupactus sericellus Hustache, 1947 c g
 Naupactus sericeus Hustache, 1947 c g
 Naupactus serieguttatus Rheinheimer, 2008 g
 Naupactus setarius Boheman, 1833 c g
 Naupactus sexmaculatus Lucas, 1857 c g
 Naupactus signatus Blanchard, 1847 c g
 Naupactus signipennis Boheman, 1840 c g
 Naupactus similis (Hustache, 1947) c g
 Naupactus simulator Voss, 1954 c g
 Naupactus sommeri Boheman, 1840 c g
 Naupactus sparsus Boheman, 1840 c g
 Naupactus stauropterus Germar, 1824 c g
 Naupactus stigmaticus Boheman, 1840 c g
 Naupactus subacutus Boheman, 1840 c g
 Naupactus submaculatus Hustache, 1947 c g
 Naupactus sulcipes Hustache, 1947 c g
 Naupactus sulfuratus Champion, 1911 c g
 Naupactus sulphureoviridis Hustache, 1938 c g
 Naupactus sulphurfer Pascoe, 1881 c g
 Naupactus suturalis Boheman, 1840 c g
 Naupactus tachirensis Bordon, 1997 c g
 Naupactus tarsalis Boheman, 1840 c g
 Naupactus tesselatus  b
 Naupactus transversus Boheman, 1840 c g
 Naupactus tremolerasi Hustache, 1947 c g
 Naupactus tucumanensis Hustache, 1947 c g
 Naupactus umbrinus Hustache, 1947 c g
 Naupactus univittatus Boheman, 1833 c g
 Naupactus variegatus Hustache, 1938 c g
 Naupactus variesignatus Voss, 1951 c g
 Naupactus velox (Fabricius, 1787) c g
 Naupactus venezolanus Hustache, 1938 c g
 Naupactus verecundus Hustache, 1947 c g
 Naupactus versatilis Hustache, 1947 c g
 Naupactus vianai Hustache, 1947 c g
 Naupactus viduatus Boheman, 1840 c g
 Naupactus vilme Bordon, 1997 c g
 Naupactus viloriui Bordon, 1997 c g
 Naupactus virens Boheman, 1840 c g
 Naupactus virescens Champion, 1911 c g
 Naupactus viridepunctatus Rheinheimer, 2011 c g
 Naupactus viridicinctus Boheman, 1833 c g
 Naupactus viridicyaneus Hustache, 1947 c g
 Naupactus viridimarginalis Hustache, 1947 c g
 Naupactus viridimicans Hustache, 1923 c g
 Naupactus viridinitens Hustache, 1947 c g
 Naupactus viridiplaptus Boheman, 1840 c g
 Naupactus viridisquamosus Boheman, 1840 c g
 Naupactus viridissimus (Hustache, 1919) c g
 Naupactus viridulus Hustache, 1947 c g
 Naupactus vossi Morrone, 1997 c g
 Naupactus xanthographus (Germar, 1824) c g
 Naupactus zoilsoni Boheman, 1840 c g

Data sources: i = ITIS, c = Catalogue of Life, g = GBIF, b = Bugguide.net

References

Naupactus